Grand Battery (Grande Batterie, meaning big or great battery) was a French artillery tactic of the Napoleonic Wars. It involved massing all available batteries into a single large, temporary one, and concentrating the firepower of their guns at a single point in the enemy's lines.

Substituting volume of fire for accuracy, a rate of fire and rapid movement, it was rarely used in the wars' early years. As the quality of artillery crews and their horses declined, it was employed more frequently during later (post-1808) campaigns.

The Grand Battery was often concentrated against the enemy's center. An early example of this is at Austerlitz in 1805, when Napoleon ordered a "roar of thunder" before the main assault upon the Pratzen Heights, which split the coalition's lines in half. Other notable uses of the tactic include: Alexandre-Antoine Hureau de Sénarmont's aggressive use of his guns at the battle of Friedland (1807), which was a major factor that won the battle, or the battle of Wagram in 1809, where a grand battery successfully halted an Austrian counterattack.

At Borodino in 1812, it was again used to break a counterattack. It failed to break the strong Russian positions and earthworks in the center along the Rayevski Redoubt.

At the Battle of Lützen (1813), it succeeded in breaking the Russo-Prussian center, ahead of the main assault by the Imperial guard. In 1815 at Waterloo, the famous opening barrage of the Grande Batterie failed to break the center of Wellington's Anglo-allied army due to his deployment of most of his forces behind the reverse slopes of the rolling hillside and the fact that the ground was still wet and muddy, preventing the usual effects of the bouncing cannonballs.

Nearly half a century later, in 1863 on the third day of the Battle of Gettysburg, Robert E. Lee, formed a Grand Battery of his own in a desperate attempt to weaken the Union center in advance of Pickett's Charge. The artillery overshot most of their targets and had to cease fire due to a lack of ammunition.

External links
 French Artillery of the Napoleonic Wars

Artillery operation
Tactical formations
Tactical formations of the Napoleonic Wars